The Charles S. Roberts Awards Hall of Fame, formally known as the Clausewitz Award Hall of Fame, is named after legendary military writer Carl von Clausewitz. The recipients of this award have made an important contribution and left their mark on the contemporary hobby of military strategy games and simulations.

The Clausewitz Award is presented with the annual Charles S. Roberts Awards.

Inductees
See footnote

1974 - Charles S. Roberts
1974 - Don Turnbull
1975 - Jim Dunnigan
1976 - Tom Shaw
1977 - Redmond A. Simonsen
1978 - John Hill
1979 - David Isby
1980 - E Gary Gygax
1981 - Marc W. Miller
1982 - Steve Jackson
1983 - Dave Arneson
1984 - Frank Chadwick
1986 - Lou Zocchi
1987 - Richard Berg
1988 - Ty Bomba
1989 - Joseph Balkoski
1990 - Jack Greene
1991 - Mark Herman
1992 - Larry Hoffman
1993 - Dean Essig
1994 - Don Greenwood
1995 - Chris Perello
1996 - Ted Raicer
1997 - Dave Powell
1998 - Vance von Borries
2000 - Winston Hamilton
2001 - Joseph Miranda
2002 - Mark Simonitch
2003 - Kevin Zucker
2004 - JD Webster
2009 - John Butterfield
2010 - Richard Borg
2011 - Ed Wimble
2012 - Brian Youse
2013-2018 - No award
2019 - Paul Banner
2020 - Walter Vejdovsky
2021 - Chad Jensen

Footnotes

External links
Hall of Fame webpage. Charles S. Roberts Awards website

Game awards
Halls of fame in Maryland
Awards established in 1974